Tarlupadu is a village in Prakasam district of the Indian state of Andhra Pradesh. It is the mandal headquarters of Tarlupadu mandal in Kandukur revenue division.

References

Villages in Prakasam district